The Jharkhand Legislative Assembly is the unicameral state legislature of Jharkhand state in India.

The seat of the Legislative Assembly is at Ranchi, the capital of the state. The term of the Legislative Assembly is five years, unless dissolved earlier. Presently, it comprises 81 members who are directly elected from single-seat constituencies.

List of constituencies
Following are the list of constituencies in the Legislative Assembly of Jharkhand.

References 

 
Jharkhand
Constituencies